BBC Radio 1's Live Lounge 2017 is a compilation album consisting of live tracks played on Clara Amfo's BBC Radio 1 show, both cover versions and original songs. The album was released on 17 November 2017, and is the thirteenth in the series of Live Lounge albums. It debuted on the iTunes UK chart at #6 and reached #3.

Track listing

References 

2017 compilation albums
2017 live albums
Live Lounge
Covers albums
Rhino Entertainment compilation albums
Sony Music compilation albums
Universal Music Group compilation albums
Universal Music TV albums